Gustaf Bernhard Friberg (August 18, 1899 – December 8, 1958) born in Manchester, New Hampshire, attended Worcester Academy, was a Utility Player for the Chicago Cubs (1919–20 and 1922–25), Philadelphia Phillies (1925–32) and Boston Red Sox (1933).

Friberg finished 18th in voting for the 1929 National League MVP Award for playing in 128 Games and having 455 At Bats, 74 Runs, 137 Hits, 21 Doubles, 10 Triples, 7 Home Runs, 55 RBI, 1 Stolen Base, 49 Walks, .301 Batting Average, .370 On-base percentage, .437 Slugging Percentage, 199 Total Bases and 13 Sacrifice Hits.

In 14 seasons he played in 1,299 Games and had 4,169 At Bats, 544 Runs, 1,170 Hits, 181 Doubles, 44 Triples, 38 Home Runs, 471 RBI, 51 Stolen Bases, 471 Walks, .281 Batting Average, .356 On-base percentage, .373 Slugging Percentage, 1,553 Total Bases and 139 Sacrifice Hits.

He died in Lynn, Massachusetts at the age of 59.

References

External links

Chicago Cubs players
Philadelphia Phillies players
Boston Red Sox players
Major League Baseball third basemen
Major League Baseball second basemen
Major League Baseball shortstops
1899 births
1958 deaths
Baseball players from New Hampshire